Dr. Sailendra Narain is a development finance specialist born in Nawadah, Bihar Province, India. For over 40 years, Narain has been a pioneer in developing the global SME sector. His specialities include: designing policy frameworks for SME Growth, establishing SME financing programs in banking and development financial institutions, and capacity building for SMEs with a focus on Entrepreneurship.

Narain has extensive experience in the Indian banking sector due to his long work experience at Reserve Bank of India (RBI), Industrial Development Bank of India (IDBI Bank), Small Industries Development Bank of India (SIDBI), and Government of Haryana for the last four decades. Narain is the Chairman of the Centre for SME Growth and Development Finance (CESMED) in Mumbai, India, providing strategic consulting on the designing of national policy programs, creating innovative financing schemes for MSMEs globally and capacity building programs. Additionally, Narain is an international consultant and advisor to various governments, multilateral institutions, DFIs, and private sectors in MSME financing and development. He has also completed numerous assignments in Asia, the Middle East, and Sub-Saharan Africa. In previous years, Narain served as consultant to the IFC/World Bank Group in the Middle East, Swiss Development Corporation (SDC) in the GMS region, World Bank in Nigeria, UNIDO in Ethiopia, and GTZ. He has also advised UNCTAD, IFAD, DFID, UNDP. Narain is also conversationally fluently in English, Hindi, Bengali (as spoken in South Asia), and Urdu (spoken).

 Current Chairman for the Centre for SME Growth and Development Finance providing strategic consulting for development and financing of Micro, Small, and Medium Enterprises (MSMEs)
 Served as chairman and managing director of SIDBI, the apex all India development financial institution focused on SME financing and growth. He was nominated by IDBI to be on the task force for establishing SIDBI, and thus created the paradigm of the bank
 Served as non-executive Board of Director for IDBI
 Present member of the governing body of Entrepreneurship Development Institute of India (EDII) with the stated objective of developing the next generation of Indian entrepreneurs and facilitating SME growth in India
 Current Chair of the taskforce on Micro, Small and Medium Enterprises (MSMEs) and Entrepreneurship in Business and Development for UN ESCAP's Business Advisory Council (UN EBAC)
 Director of Institutional Finance and Joint Secretary to the Government of Haryana

Education and training
Narain earned his first master's degree in sociology, finishing with First-Class First, Gold Medallist. Later, he earned his second master's degree in economics, again earning First Class distinction. Narain continued his business education, and completed a PhD in development economics. His dissertation focused on the effects of small industries on Indian economic growth. All three of these degrees were completed at Patna University. In addition to these distinguished degrees, Narain also became a certified associate in banking and finance to the Indian Institute of Bankers (CAIIB) from 1966 to 1968. Narain also received other training from the Bankers Training College, Reserve Bank of India, SME Financing, Rural Credit National Institute for MSMEs, Government of India, Financing Small Industries & Rural Enterprises, and Extension Services for MSMEs University of Sussex, United Kingdom.

Throughout his career, Narain has been invited to serve as a visiting faculty member to various universities and institutions internationally. One such university was Harvard University, where Narain designed and co-directed an advanced training course with Dr. Glenn Jenkins. Later he co-directed yet another advanced programme on enterprise development jointly with Professor Ray Smilor for deans and faculty of B-Schools from SAARC member countries at the University of California, San Diego, USA.

Professional positions
Narain held the position of chairman and managing director of the Small Industries Development Bank of India (SIDBI) from 1990 to 2000. Narain was nominated by IDBI to serve on the Three-member task force responsible for creating and establishing SIDBI, under the Parliament Act of SIDBI 1989. Subsequently, Narain became one of the chief architect's for designing and implementing the scope and service offering of the bank. As part of Narain's vision, SIDBI successfully implemented several innovative programs aimed at sustainable growth and financings for SMEs. Under his leadership, SIDBI earned the prestigious distinction of being one of the Top 50 Development Banks by The Banker-London, and also won the prestigious Asian Banking Award in 1999. Another milestone reached under Narain's tenure was the establishment of The SIDBI Foundation for Micro Credit, where funds were disbursed by the line of credit to the NGOs and later given to the rural poor. Narain also led the internationalization of SIDBI by signing a $500 million pact with US EXIM Bank and IDBI.

Currently, Narain holds the chairman position for the Centre for SME Growth and Development Finance in Mumbai, India. In his role as chairman, Narain provides strategic consulting on the design of national policy programmes for the development and financing of micro, small, and medium enterprises (MSMEs), and rural industries. He specializes in development banking, micro finance, and rural credit and has played a pivotal role in advising various governments, multilateral institutions, DFIs, and private sectors in MSME financing and development. Additionally, Narain is an international financial and economic consultant. As an expert consultant, he works with a myriad of public and private sector institutions and United Nations' agencies to provide technical and advisory services, particularly in Asia, the Middle East, and Sub-Saharan Africa.

Narain is also the present chair of the UN ESCAP's Business Advisory Council (EBAC) Task Force on MSMEs & Entrepreneurship. Additionally, Narain serves on the governing body of the Entrepreneurship Development Institute of India (EDII) whose primary objective is the create entrepreneurs and transition SMEs into growth oriented enterprises.

UN ESCAP programs
As a founding member and the current Chair of the UN ESCAP Business Advisory Council's MSME Taskforce, Narain has pioneered the following programs:

Ahmedabad Charter
Narain significantly contributed to the development of the Ahmedabad Charter, established in 2013. The charter was created by the delegates of the International Workshop on Entrepreneurship in Socially Responsible Business for Development in Asia and the Pacific and Young Business Leaders Programme. Participants include UN ESCAP member countries of Afghanistan, India, Lao PDR, Myanmar, Nepal, Philippines, Sri Lank, and Vietnam. The Ahmedabad Charter pledge is as follows:
To practice and to spearhead the mission of boosting the emergence and growth of entrepreneurship and socially responsible business in the private sector for inclusive and sustainable development in Asia and the Pacific. IDBI Bank and the Small Industries Development Bank of India (SIDBI) sponsored this charter.

Trade finance for SMEs
Narain's most recent project for UN ESCAP, as of April 2015, focuses on creating a roadmap with innovative recommendations for establishing a vibrant and sustainable trade finance practice in APAC for SMEs which was presented in Indonesia on 29–30 April 2015.

Young Business Leaders Programme
As Chair of the UN ESCAP Economic Business Council's Task Force on MSMEs and Entrepreneurship for Development in Asia and the Pacific, Narain conducts the Young Business Leaders Programme. This program is designed for sensitizing entrepreneurs, banks, and DFIs to the ethical principles of Socially Responsible Business and Investments. Narain has designed and implemented several credit-based financial schemes and non-financial support services for assisting MSMEs, as well as risk mitigation-collateral-free SME credit guarantee schemes for banks and DFIs.

Vietnam Chamber of Commerce
Narain facilitated the Vietnam Chamber of Commerce by starting a SME innovation programme in the Central Region of Vietnam. This Chamber, founded by VCCI-Da Nang, started an innovative programme, namely SME Market Development Programme and its flagship website, Smartex. Narain provided technical assistance in developing a comprehensive market development programme for SMEs, their globalization, and entry into the global value chain.

International consultations
Narain's professional work extends internationally to include numerous regions and countries.

Awards
 Recipient Asian Banker Award
 The Special Honour Award, conferred on Dr. Narain in 1997 by the World Association for Small and Medium Enterprises (WASME) at Miami, USA in recognition of significant contributions made towards promotion of SMEs
 The Plaque of Merit Special Award (jointly with VCCI-Da Nang) by the Association of Development Financial Institutions in Asia and The Pacific (ADFIAP) for designing and implementing innovative SME Market Development Programme in the Central Region of Vietnam

Press coverage
 "Dr. Shailendra Narain, Managing Director SIDBI: Speaking about SIDBI's Growth in the Last Nine Years and the Bank's Focus in the New Millennium"
 Narender Kumar Jain's Working Capital Management
 "SIDBI to Raise Further Rs. 300 Crores Through Private Placement"
 "SIDBI to Set Up Biotech Fund"
 "SIDBI is Planning a $50 Million IT Fund"
 "SIDBI, NRDC Join Hands to Fund Hi-Tech Industries"
 "SIDBI To Begin Export Factoring"
 "Tech Update For SSI Sector Planned"
 "Bridging the Gap Foundation, Advisory Council"

References

Indian bankers